Encyclia pyriformis is a species of orchid.

External links 
 
 

pyriformis